The Nieuwe Kerk is a Protestant church in the city of Delft in the Netherlands. The building is located on Delft Market Square (Markt), opposite to the City Hall (Dutch: Stadhuis). In 1584, William the Silent was entombed here in a mausoleum designed by Hendrick and Pieter de Keyser. Since then members of the House of Orange-Nassau have been entombed in the royal crypt. The latest are Queen Juliana and her husband Prince Bernhard in 2004. The private royal family crypt is not open to the public. The church tower, with the most recent recreation of the spire which was designed by Pierre Cuypers and completed in 1872, is the second highest in the Netherlands, after the Domtoren in Utrecht.

History

The New Church, formerly the church of St. Ursula (14th century), is the burial place of the princes of Orange. The church is remarkable for its fine tower and chime of bells, and contains the splendid allegorical monument of William the Silent, crafted by Hendrik de Keyser and his son Pieter about the year 1621, and the tomb of Hugo Grotius, born in Delft in 1583, whose statue, erected in 1886, stands in the marketplace outside the church. The tower was built 1396-1496 by Jacob van der Borch, who also built the Dom in Utrecht during the years 1444-1475. The monument for Hugo de Groot was made in 1781. The mechanical clock has 18 bells by Francois Hemony from 1659 and 30 modern bells. In the church tower there is a bell from 1662 by Francois Hemony with a diameter of 104 centimeters. In the tower there are also bells no longer in use, including 13 from 1659 by Francois Hemony, 3 from 1678 by Pieter Hemony, 3 from 1750 from Joris de Mery, and 1 from Gillett and Johnston from 1929.

The Kerk appears in the golden Age painting by Carel Fabritius, A View of Delft. In 1586, Flemish scientist Simon Stevin used the church's tower to conduct an experiment on gravitational forces.

Gallery

Recent discoveries 
In September 2021, archaeologists announced that the remains of around 200 people had been discovered during the expansion of the royal burial chamber at Nieuwe Kerk.

People buried in the royal crypt

Eleven people are buried in the old vault:
William the Silent (1584)
Louise de Coligny (1621)
Maurice of Nassau, Prince of Orange (1625)
Elisabeth, daughter of Frederick Henry, Prince of Orange (1630)
Isabella Charlotte, daughter of Frederick Henry, Prince of Orange (1642)
Frederick Henry, Prince of Orange (1647)
Countess Catharina Belgica of Nassau (1648)
Amalia of Solms-Braunfels (1675)
Three unidentified bodies.

35 people are buried in the new vault:
William II, Prince of Orange (1651)
Eldest stillborn daughter of William IV, Prince of Orange (1736)
William IV, Prince of Orange (1751)
Anne, Princess Royal and Princess of Orange (1759)
George Willem Belgicus, son of Princess Carolina of Orange-Nassau (1762)
A stillborn child of Princess Carolina of Orange-Nassau (1767)
Eldest stillborn son of William V, Prince of Orange (1769)
Willem Georg Frederik, son of William V, Prince of Orange (1896)
Princess Pauline of Orange-Nassau (1806)
William V, Prince of Orange (1806)
Frederika Louise Wilhelmina, daughter of William V, Prince of Orange (1819)
Princess Wilhelmina of Prussia (1822)
Prince Ernest Casimir of the Netherlands (1860)
Willem Frederik Nicolaas Karel, son of Prince Frederick of the Netherlands (1834)
Wilhelmine of Prussia (1837)
William I of the Netherlands (1844)
Willem Frederik Nicolaas Albert, son of Prince Frederick of the Netherlands (1846)
Prince Alexander of the Netherlands (1848)
William II of the Netherlands (1849)
Prince Maurice of the Netherlands (1850)
Anna Pavlovna of Russia (1865)
Princess Louise of Prussia (1870)
Amalia of Saxe-Weimar-Eisenach (1872)
Sophie of Württemberg (1877)
Prince Henry of the Netherlands (1879)
William, Prince of Orange (1879)
Prince Frederick of the Netherlands (1881)
Alexander, Prince of Orange (1884)
William III of the Netherlands (1890)
Emma of Waldeck and Pyrmont (1934)
Prince Hendrik of the Netherlands (1934)
Wilhelmina of the Netherlands (1962)
Prince Claus of the Netherlands (2002)
Juliana of the Netherlands (2004)
Prince Bernhard of Lippe-Biesterfeld (2004)

William III, Prince of Orange, is not buried in the royal crypt.  He is buried in Westminster Abbey, due to his position as King of England at the time of his death.

See also
 List of tallest structures built before the 20th century

References

External links

Nieuwe Kerk Delft 

Churches in South Holland
Protestant churches in the Netherlands
Rijksmonuments in Delft
Towers in South Holland
1396 establishments in Europe
Burial sites of the House of Orange-Nassau